Wolf Run is a tributary of Muncy Creek in Lycoming County, Pennsylvania, in the United States. The stream flows through Wolf Township, Muncy Township, and Muncy Creek Township. The stream's watershed has an area of 10.8 square miles. Slightly over two million pounds of sediment flow through the stream every year. A fort existed near Wolf Run for several hundred years until the late 1800s or early 1900s. At least three bridges cross the stream.

Course

Wolf Run begins near the western border of Wolf Township, between Roundtop and Long Hill. It flows southwards inside a valley and turns southeast after some distance and then turns south again. In the southern part of Wolf Township, the stream leaves the valley, flows under U.S. Route 220, and turns southwest, exiting Wolf Township and entering Muncy Township. It gradually turns west and passes near the community of Pennsdale before turning south. Near the border of the township, the stream crosses under Interstate 180 and enters Muncy Creek Township. The stream turns west and then south again to parallel the West Branch Susquehanna River. Near the borough of Muncy, it reaches its confluence with Muncy Creek, very near to Muncy Creek's confluence with the West Branch Susquehanna River.

Hydrology
Wolf Run experiences siltation and also experiences stream bank erosion.

Geology and geography

The entire watershed is in the ridge and valley geographic region.

Of the rock in the Wolf Run watershed, 50 percent is interbedded sedimentary rock, 30 percent is sandstone, 15 percent is shale, and 5 percent consists of carbonate rocks.

Watershed

History
John Franklin Meginness stated in the late 1800s that it was under 300 to 500 years old. The fortification was square and situated in an east-to-west alignment. It enclosed about an acre of land. It had been the subject of much discussion in the early 20th century. It had already been deserted for a long period of time and was in a state of decay when Conrad Weiser reached the area on March 21, 1737. The historian John Franklin Meginness has stated that it is possible that Étienne Brûlé, a Frenchman, visited an area near Wolf Run as early as 1615, but this is not certain.

The Genesee Road, which was opened in the early 1800s and ran from Muncy to the Genesee River, passed by Wolf Run. A stone gristmill was once built on the stream by William Ellis. In the 1800s or early 1900s, a railroad was built near Wolf Run and it passed over the Ancient Fortification. During the construction of the railroad at this location, several artifacts, including a piece of Indian pottery, were found. Charcoal and other evidence of ancient fires were also found near Wolf Run during the construction of the railroad. In the late 1800s, the Cogan House school was located on Wolf Run.

Wolf Run is named for the relatively large number of wolves that historically lived near the stream.

In 2013, Lycoming County rehabilitated the U.S. Route 220 bridge over Wolf Run at a cost of $770,000. Two other bridges over the stream were repaired in the same year for a cost of slightly over $1 million each.

Biology
Wolf Run has been designated a High-Quality Coldwater Fishery and a Migratory Fishery. Parts of the stream do not have a riparian buffer. In a book dated to 1909, Edward A. Straub wrote that there were large catfish and eels lived in Wolf Run.

A white oak tree with a trunk circumference of over  historically grew near Wolf Run, on the Adlum Farm. It was cut down in 1852.

See also
 Little Muncy Creek, next tributary of Muncy Creek going upstream
 List of rivers of Pennsylvania

References

External links

Rivers of Lycoming County, Pennsylvania
Rivers of Pennsylvania
Tributaries of Muncy Creek